Peoples Bank Building is a historic bank building located at Kinston, Lenoir County, North Carolina. It was built about 1923, and is a modest two-story, cinder block building, sheathed in brick and in the Classical Revival style.  It has a flat roof with raised parapet ornamented by brick panels outlined in limestone.  The front facade features a large arched opening with a stone surround.  The building housed one of only two African-American-owned banks to operate in the city of Kinston.  The bank ceased to operate in 1931, and the building has housed a number of commercial enterprises.

It was listed on the National Register of Historic Places in 1989.

References

African-American history of North Carolina
Bank buildings on the National Register of Historic Places in North Carolina
Neoclassical architecture in North Carolina
Commercial buildings completed in 1923
Buildings and structures in Lenoir County, North Carolina
National Register of Historic Places in Lenoir County, North Carolina